Francis Roy Brown (September 13, 1896 – November 30, 1960) was a politician in Manitoba, Canada. He served in the Legislative Assembly of Manitoba as a Liberal-Progressive from 1953 to 1958.

Brown was educated in Winnipeg. He enlisted in the Cycle Corps at the beginning of World War I, and served overseas in France, seeing action at Ypres, Vimy Ridge, and Passchendaele. Brown joined the Royal Flying Corps in 1917, and remained with this group until the end of the war.

Francis Roy Brown was throughout his life mistaken for the pilot that shot down Baron Von Richthofen, a.k.a."The Red Baron". That credit remains with A. Roy Brown, of Carleton Place, Ontario. Both Roy Browns were enlisted with the Royal Flying Corps at the same time. They both returned to Canada with English 'war brides', and both established their careers in the early aviation industry flourish of the 1920s, '30s, and '40s. For the remainder of their lives, F. Roy Brown would be known as "Arctic Roy", while A. Roy Brown was known as "Richthofen Roy". They met for the first time at a POW reunion in 1937.

Brown was intrinsic to the discovery of a group of seven men who were lost in the Arctic in late 1929. It was the greatest air search and rescue in Canadian history and remains as such, given they had no radar or radios. Col. C.D.W. MacAlpine and his exploration party of cartographers, geographers from McGill University set off to the chart the North, and after the undercarriage collapsed in their aircraft, they were lost in the far northern reaches of the Arctic, near Baker Lake see The Montreal Gazette November–December articles entitled "Lost in the Barrens!".

After the war, he was one of four who founded Western Canada Airways in Manitoba, and was superintendent and chief pilot of the company's airmail operations from 1930 to 1932.
He was Manager of the Lac du Bonnet government airbase during the early 1930s. He helped establish Wings Limited, and Central Northern Airways, a predecessor of TransAir Limited, in 1947, and served as its vice-president. He was also a member of the Winnipeg Flying Club, and an executive on the Wartime Pilots' & Observers Association. During World War II he was a test pilot for McDonald Brothers now Bristol Aerospace. Brown had a legacy association with A.V.Roe, having flown numerous single engine planes designed by Roe during his extensive years of bush flying.

Brown's piloting skills were undoubtedly useful to his political career, as he represented the northern constituency of Rupertsland in the Manitoba assembly. During the 1950s, many of Rupertsland's communities were remote and isolated, and could only be reached by plane. Brown himself was credited with bringing considerable development into the region.

He was elected to the Manitoba legislature in the 1953 provincial election, defeating fellow Liberal-Progressive H. Boulette, 1,136 votes to 982. In this period of Manitoba history, voting in Rupertsland was deferred for logistical reasons until after the rest of the province had voted. The Liberal-Progressives had already won a majority government, and no opposition parties contested the constituency.

Brown was resoundingly defeated when he ran for re-election in the 1958 campaign. The Progressive Conservatives under Dufferin Roblin had already won a minority government in the rest of the province, and there was little incentive for voters in this remote area to elect an opposition member. Brown lost to Progressive Conservative candidate Joseph Jeannotte, 2,342 votes to 511.

He was posthumously inducted to Canada's Aviation Hall of Fame in 1975.

External links
Hall of Fame site
"The Origin and Growth of Western Canadian Aviation as I Have Seen It
by Roy Brown", 1957–58 

1896 births
1961 deaths
Manitoba Liberal Party MLAs